Brockman National Park is a national park in the South West region of Western Australia,  south of Perth and  south of Pemberton.

The park, situated on both sides of the Pemberton-Northcliffe road, is a eucalypt forest composed of karri Eucalyptus diversicolor interspersed with marri Corymbia calophylla. The forest understorey is made up of a mix of plants including the swamp peppermint Taxandria linearifolia, karri hazel, karri wattle (Acacia pentadenia) and the karri sheoak Allocasuarina decussata , all of which thrive in the damp conditions.

The northern border of the park is the Warren River and the Warren National Park borders it to the west.

No entry fee applies for the park and no facilities are available to visitors.

The name is taken from the nearby Yeagarup Homestead that used to be known as Brockman Station.

See also
 Protected areas of Western Australia

References 

National parks of Western Australia
Warren bioregion
Protected areas established in 1977
1977 establishments in Australia